John II (born 1270-75; died 11 March 1340) was a German nobleman of the house of Sponheim. He succeeded his elder brother Simon II.

House of Sponheim

1270s births
1340 deaths